The 53rd Arizona State Legislature, consisting of the Arizona State Senate and the Arizona House of Representatives, was constituted in Phoenix from January 1, 2017 to December 31, 2018, during the second two years of Doug Ducey's first full term in office. Both the Senate and the House membership remained constant at 30 and 60, respectively. Democrats gained one seat in the Senate, leaving the Republicans with a 17-13 majority. Republicans also maintained an 35–25 majority in the House after losing one seat to the Democrats.

Sessions
The Legislature met for two regular sessions at the State Capitol in Phoenix. The first opened on January 9, 2017, and adjourned on May 10, while the Second Regular Session convened on January 8, 2018 and adjourned sine die on May 4.

There was one Special Session, which was convened on January 22, 2018 and adjourned on January 25.

State Senate

Members

The asterisk (*) denotes members of the previous Legislature who continued in office as members of this Legislature.

House of Representatives

Members 
The asterisk (*) denotes members of the previous Legislature who continued in office as members of this Legislature.

References

Arizona legislative sessions
2017 in Arizona
2018 in Arizona
2017 U.S. legislative sessions
2018 U.S. legislative sessions